Hayden High School is a historic high school complex for African-American students located at Franklin, Virginia.  The main building was completed in 1953, and is a two-story, "L"-plan brick clad building with two smaller one-story additions.  Associated with the main school are two 1969 one-story classroom buildings situated behind the school.  Hayden High School is an important site in the fight over both equalization and desegregation of public schools.  The school closed in the 1980s, after housing a middle school.

The school was named for educator Della Irving Hayden (1851-1924), founder of the Franklin Normal and Industrial Institute. It was added to the National Register of Historic Places in 2013.

References

African-American history of Virginia
Buildings and structures in Franklin, Virginia
National Register of Historic Places in Franklin, Virginia
Public high schools in Virginia
School buildings completed in 1953
School buildings on the National Register of Historic Places in Virginia